Niyaraq (Azerbaijani: Niyara) also romanized as Niaraq and Niara is a village in Vilkij-e Markazi Rural District, Vilkij District, Namin County, Ardabil Province, Iran.

Demography of Niyaraq 
At the 2006 census, its population was 1,939, in 420 families. As with the majority of people in Ardabil province of Iranian Azerbaijan, people of Niyaraq are native speakers of Azerbaijani language.

References 

Towns and villages in Namin County